Ainudrilus is a genus of clitellate oligochaete worms.

Species 
The World Register of Marine Species recognizes the following species in the genus Ainudrilus:

 Ainudrilus angustivasa Pinder & Halse, 2002
 Ainudrilus billabongus  (Brinkhurst, 1984) 
 Ainudrilus brendae Erséus, 1997
 Ainudrilus dartnalli Erséus & Grimm, 2002
 Ainudrilus fultoni  (Brinkhurst, 1982) 
 Ainudrilus geminus Erséus, 1990
 Ainudrilus gibsoni Erséus, 1990
 Ainudrilus lutulentus  (Erséus, 1984) 
 Ainudrilus mediocris Erséus, 1997
 Ainudrilus ngopitchup Pinder & Halse, 2002
 Ainudrilus nharna Pinder & Brinkhurst, 2000
 Ainudrilus oceanicus Finogenova, 1982
 Ainudrilus pauciseta Wang & Erséus, 2003
 Ainudrilus piliferus Erséus, 1997
 Ainudrilus stagnalis Erséus, 1997
 Ainudrilus taitamensis Erséus, 1990
 Ainudrilus vallus Erséus & Wang, 2003

References

Further reading
Erséus, C. "Additional notes on the taxonomy of the marine Oligochaeta of Hong Kong, with a description of a new species of Tubificidae." Marine Flora and Fauna of Hong Kong and Southern China, Hong Kong. Proc. 8th. Int. Mar. Biol. Workshop. Hong Kong Univ. Press. Vol. 1995. 1997.
Hallett, S. L., C. Erséus, and R. J. G. Lester. "Actinosporea from Hong Kong marine oligochaeta." Morton, B eds (1997): 1–7.
Erséus, Christer. "Mangroves and marine oligochaete diversity." Wetlands Ecology and Management 10.3 (2002): 197–202.

External links
WORMS

Tubificina